Rodrigo Nicolás Brasesco Pérez (born 25 January 1986 in Montevideo) is an Uruguayan footballer who currently plays for Racing Club de Montevideo as a centre back.

Club career
Born in Montevideo, Uruguay, Brasesco started his career with Sud América. In 2008, he moved to Uruguayan Primera Division side Racing Club. A regular starter for Racing, in 2009 Brasesco helped his club qualify to the Copa Libertadores for the first time in its history. During his career in Uruguay Brasesco has appeared in 154 league matches and scored 4 goals.

On January 10, 2011, D.C. United signed Brasesco on a loan deal from Racing Club de Montevideo. He made his debut for the club as a late substitute in their opening game of the 2011 MLS season, a 3-1 win over Columbus Crew, but was waived by the club on June 14, having made just three first team appearances for the team.

References

External links
 
 

1986 births
Living people
Uruguayan footballers
Uruguayan expatriate footballers
Uruguayan Primera División players
Major League Soccer players
Primera B de Chile players
Ascenso MX players
Sud América players
Racing Club de Montevideo players
D.C. United players
Magallanes footballers
Cafetaleros de Chiapas footballers
Uruguayan expatriate sportspeople in Chile
Uruguayan expatriate sportspeople in Mexico
Uruguayan expatriate sportspeople in the United States
Expatriate footballers in Chile
Expatriate footballers in Mexico
Expatriate soccer players in the United States
Association football defenders